Kierzki  is a village in the administrative district of Gmina Banie Mazurskie, within Gołdap County, Warmian-Masurian Voivodeship, in north-eastern Poland, close to the border with the Kaliningrad Oblast of Russia. It is located in the historic region of Masuria.

The village has a population of 120.

The village was founded by Polish people in 1710.

References

Kierzki
Populated places established in 1710